Dalvey is a place near to the town of Forres in Moray, Scotland. The name gave rise to the Baronets Grant of Dalvey, Elgin.

Villages in Moray